Villa Hidalgo is located within the municipality of Villaflores, in northern Chiapas, Mexico. As of 2010, it had a population of 2,502.

References

Populated places in Chiapas